88Glam2 is the debut studio album by Canadian hip hop duo 88Glam. It was released through XO Records and Republic Records on November 16, 2018. The album features guest appearances from Nav and Gunna. Production was handled by 88Glam duo members Derek Wise and 88Camino, as well as Villa Beatz, AlexOnWeed, Yung Shrimp Tempura, AAA Gray, Joseph L'étranger, Take a Daytrip, Russ Chell, Money Musik, Trouble Trouble, Frost, Rex Kudo, Sevn Thomas, Maaly Raw, Pro Logic, Dez Wright, Cubeatz, and Zancanella. The album was re-released and called 88Glam2.5 on April 12, 2019. It contains two additional remixes of the songs "Snow Globe" and "Lil Boat", which add features from Nav and Lil Yachty, respectively. The album serves as 88Glam's last release under XO and Republic as they split from both labels in early 2020. The album was supported by one single: "Lil Boat", which was released on November 9, 2018. It was remixed to include a feature from American rapper Lil Yachty, in which the song is named after a popular nickname of his, which was released on March 8, 2019.

Background
About two weeks after the release of the album, 88Glam sat down for an interview with Billboard. Both members of the duo commentated their opinions on the project.

88Camino said:I think I am most excited about being able to take the new music on the road. We have been performing our first project for the past year. That is such a big part of our act, right? Still, the music is only a small portion of what people connect to us as an act. So with the new music, we can almost embody it. We will be able to present the fully developed idea of what the project is supposed to represent when we perform it live.

Derek Wise said:For me, it is this feeling of getting off all of the creative content that we have for our fans. I know they have been waiting for it. We have not dropped a project of music in a little while. Again, there is just this feeling of giving fans what they want. It means the world.

Track listing

Notes
  signifies a co-producer.
  signifies an additional producer.

Personnel
 Mixx – mixing , studio personnel 
 Villa Beatz – programming 
 Joseph L'étranger – programming 
 Jacob Richards – mixing assistant 
 Mike Seaberg – mixing assistant 
 Rashawn Mclean – mixing assistant 
 Take a Daytrip
 David Biral – drum programming , engineering , mixing , studio personnel 
 Denzel Baptiste – drum programming , mixing , studio personnel 
 Russ Chell – guitar loops 
 Jaycen Joshua – mixing 
 Money Musik – programming 
 Trouble Trouble – programming 
 Frost – programming 
 Rex Kudo – programming , engineering , studio personnel 
 Sevn Thomas – programming 
 Maaly Raw – programming 
 Pro Logic – programming 
 Dez Wright – programming 
 Derek Wise – programming 
 AlexOnWeed – programming 
 Gordon Goggs – mixing , studio personnel

Charts

References

2018 albums
Republic Records albums
Albums produced by Take a Daytrip
Albums produced by Cubeatz